Reginald Joseph Hickey (27 March 1906 – 13 December 1973) was an Australian rules footballer who was a player, the captain, the captain-coach, and the non-playing coach for the  Geelong Football Club in the Victorian Football League (VFL) between 1928 and 1940 (player), and between 1949 and 1959 (non-player). 

In the 34 seasons from 1926 to 1959 he was involved in four Geelong VFL premierships: one as a player (1931), one as captain-coach (1937), and two as non-playing coach (1951, and 1952) – he was also the non-playing coach of a losing Grand Final team (1953), where an inaccurate Geelong (8.17 (65)) lost to Collingwood (11.11 (77)).

Family
The son of Martin Hickey (1873-1944),<ref>[https://trove.nla.gov.au/newspaper/article/11816858/627588 Deaths: Hickey, The Argus, (Saturday, 4 March 1944), p.13.]</ref> and Margaret Teresa Hickey (1877-1965), née Meaney, Reginald Joseph Hickey was born in Collingwood on 27 March 1906.

He married Doreen Stella Markin (1916-1963) on 26 October 1938.

He was the nephew of Fitzroy (VFA & VFL) footballer Pat Hickey, and Fitzroy (VFA) footballer and Fitzroy (VFL) administrator Con Hickey. He is the grandfather of former Port Adelaide coach and captain Matthew Primus, and  AFL Women's (AFLW) player Melissa Hickey is the granddaughter of his cousin.

He was in the same class as the inaugural Brownlow Medal winner, Edward "Carji" Greeves at the Struan Dam State School (3730), near to Cressy and Lismore in Western Victoria.

Football
A strong, fast, and intelligent player, who could kick with either foot, Hickey played 245 games for Geelong in a career spanning fifteen years, including two premierships, two club best-and-fairest awards, and nine seasons as club captain. Hickey also was a hard (but equally fair) coach, who helping build Geelong into a powerhouse during the early 1950s.

Hickey coached Geelong in 304 matches, including 91 matches as playing coach. As coach, he had a 60% winning record.

 Playing career 
Geelong recruited Hickey for the start of the 1926 season, with Hickey himself making a name as a tough defender, renowned for his dashing runs out of the defensive half.

He retired as a player in May 1940.

 Captain-coach 
Hickey was named captain-coach in 1932, but relinquished the coaching position to Arthur Coghlan the following season, although he remained captain of the team. In 1936, Hickey resumed his role as captain-coach, and continued, as such, until his retirement in 1940. By then he was the games record-holder for the club, and held that record until Bill Goggin took over in 1971.

Hickey's finest moment as captain-coach came in the 1937 Grand Final against Collingwood. Until the three quarter time break (when the scores were level), the contest had been relatively even between, with neither side being able to get ahead by more than a few points. In an effort to break the deadlock, and in a coaching move almost unheard of in those days, Hickey made wholesale positional changes:
 moving Les Hardiman from full-forward to centre half-back (Hardiman nullified the previously dominating Ron Todd);
 moving Jack Evans from the ruck to replace Hardiman at full-forward (Evans kicked 6 goals);
 moving Joe Sellwood from centre half-back to replace Gordon Abbott at centre half-forward; and
 moving Abbott from centre half-forward to replace Evans in the ruck.

His strategy worked, and Geelong comfortably won the match, kicking 6.6 (42) to Collingwood's 1.4 (10) in the last quarter.

Brownlow Medal
Hickey came third to Fitzroy's Haydn Bunton in the 1931 Brownlow Medal, and second to Fitzroy's Denis Ryan in the 1936 Brownlow Medal.

 Coaching career 
Due to travel restrictions and an exodus of players to war service in the Second World War, Geelong were unable to field a side for the 1942 and 1943 seasons.

Players transferred to other clubs; when Geelong rejoined the competition in 1944 season, but not all of those transferred returned to Geelong. The club finished close to or on the bottom of the ladder for the rest of the 1940s, claiming the wooden spoon in 1944 with a 1-17 record, and narrowly avoiding the 1945 wooden spoon on percentage.

Hickey was appointed coach for the third time in 1949, with immediate success. Though the club failed to make the finals, they showed marked improvement.

Hickey had a policy of fast, direct play, relentlessly drilling his players to ensure they made every possession count. In 1950, Geelong made the finals for the first time in ten years. For the next two and a half years, Geelong was the strongest side in the competition, winning two consecutive flags, and establishing a VFL/AFL record of 23 wins (unbeaten streak of 26) in a row during 1952 and 1953. It wasn't until the end of 1953 that Collingwood, with the use of ugly and restrictive football, were able to defeat on Hickey's side. Geelong lost the Grand Final, and saw little success for the rest of Hickey's tenure — he retired from coaching at the end of the 1959 season.

Death
He died at Geelong on 13 December 1973.

Recognition
 Selected as the captain, coach, and centre half back of Geelong's official "Team of the Century".
 Selected on the interchange bench in the Victorian Team of the 20th Century.
 Inducted into the Australian Football Hall of Fame in 1996.
 The Eastern Stand at Skilled Stadium, Geelong's home ground, is named after him.
 The prestigious R.J. Hickey Award, is given annually by the Geelong club to an individual selected for his outstanding service to Australian rules football.

Footnotes

References
 Button, James, Comeback: The Fall and Rise of Geelong, Melbourne University Press, (Carlton), 2016.  
 Davie, Geoff, and The Geelong Cats, Cats On the Prowl; Stories From the Dressing Room, HarperCollins, (Pymble), 1994. 
 Rodgers, Stephen, Every Game Ever Played : VFL/AFL Results 1897-1991 (Third Edition), Viking O'Neill, (Ringwood) 1992. 
 Ross, John (ed), 100 Years of Australian Football 1897–1996: The Complete Story of the AFL, All the Big Stories, All the Great Pictures, All the Champions, Every AFL Season Reported, Viking, (Ringwood), 1996. 
 Ross, John & Hutchinson, Garrie, The Clubs: The Complete History of Every Club in the VFL/AFL, Viking, (Ringwood) 1998. 
 It’s More Than A Name: Hickey Edition, thehickeystand.com, 24 April 2018.

External links

 
 
 History of the Geelong Football Club at australianfootball.com''.
 Reg Hickey's coaching statistics from AFL Tables.
 Brownlow Medal Career Totals from AFL Tables.
 Reg Hickey at Boyles Football Photos.

1906 births
1973 deaths
Australian rules footballers from Melbourne
Australian Rules footballers: place kick exponents
Geelong Football Club players
Geelong Football Club Premiership players
Geelong Football Club coaches
Geelong Football Club Premiership coaches
Carji Greeves Medal winners
Australian Football Hall of Fame inductees
Two-time VFL/AFL Premiership players
Three-time VFL/AFL Premiership coaches
People from Collingwood, Victoria